Gamcheon-dong is a subdivision of Saha-gu district in central-west Busan, South Korea. Gamcheon Culture Village, which features steep streets, twisting alleys, and brightly painted houses, is located in Gamcheon-dong. Some painted street murals, art installations, cafes, stores, museums, workshops, and craft boutiques have also sprung up in the area. The area was previously known as Taegeukdo Village.

Previously one of the city's poorer areas, the government of Korea invested money in Gamcheon-dong in 2009 to fund the "Dreaming of Machu Picchu in Busan Project". Subsequently the area has won several regional awards including the 2012 UN-HABITAT Asian Townscape Award and a cultural excellence award from Korea's Ministry of Culture, Sports and Tourism.

References

Neighbourhoods in Busan
Saha District